Amblyseius anomalus is a species of mite in the family Phytoseiidae.

References

anomalus
Articles created by Qbugbot